Nite Flights is the sixth and final studio album by the American pop group the Walker Brothers, released in July 1978 by GTO Records. Unlike their previous two albums which consisted almost entirely of cover versions, each member of the group wrote songs for Nite Flights; two by Gary Walker with Scott Walker and John Walker each contributing four. "The Electrician" was released as a single from the album. The four Scott-penned tracks were released on that year's Shutout EP.

Recording
After reforming in 1974, the Walker Brothers released two albums, No Regrets and Lines, both of which were commercial failures. With enough money from the label to make one more record, the trio spent all of 1977 writing songs before returning to the studio. Scott Walker, who had not written a song since his 1970 solo album 'Til the Band Comes In, began writing again after hearing Joni Mitchell, soon after finding other influences: "It's an inspiration to learn that Henry Miller didn't write Tropic of Cancer until he was 33."

The album was recorded in February 1978 at Scorpio Sound in London. Scott brought David Bowie's 1977 album "Heroes" to the studio, where it was, according to engineer Steve Parker, used as "the reference album when we were making Nite Flights".

Author Chris O'Leary describes "The Electrician" as more experimental than Bowie and Brian Eno's work on "Heroes", stating there was "nothing of its like" at the time.

Content
Nite Flights was the last album the trio recorded as a group, although the structure of the album, effectively split into three sections in which each member writes and sings, has led to both critics and band members describing it as more akin to three miniature solo albums than a true group album.

The album is most notable for the first four songs, all written and sung by Scott Walker—his first original material since his 1970 solo album 'Til the Band Comes In, all of them notably darker in tone than the rest of the album, indicating the direction in which his later solo work would head.

"The Electrician" is described by O'Leary as "a love song about American complicity in Central American torture regimes".

The artwork was designed by Hipgnosis.

Release
Nite Flights was released in July 1978, through record label GTO. "The Electrician" was released as a single but, like the album, failed to chart. Scott Walker's four songs were also released as Shutout E.P. in 1978, under the Walker Brothers name.

Nite Flights was long out of print until the mid-1990s when it was re-released as a budget CD. In 2001, two outtakes from the Nite Flights sessions surfaced on the compilation album If You Could Hear Me Now. "The Ballad" written by John Walker is a complete song, the second outtake, "Tokyo Rimshot" is an unfinished instrumental written by Scott Walker.

Reception

In a 2008 retrospective for Uncut magazine, Chris Roberts called the album "extraordinary", commending the seamlessness of the brothers' styles and notes that, with the first four tracks alone, Nite Flights "is one of the most important works of its time", influencing the likes of Radiohead, Pulp, and Japan. In a retrospective review for AllMusic, Dave Thompson wrote, "Every once in a while, an album comes along that doesn't simply surprise you, it takes you down an alleyway, rips off all your clothes, then hares away with your socks on its head, singing selections from South Pacific."

Legacy
Nite Flights was the Walkers Brothers' final album; the band split soon after its release. Roberts partially attributed the album's commercial failure to the time of its release, when punk rock was the dominant genre. Nevertheless, the experimental style of Scott's tracks on Nite Flights laid the stylistic groundwork for his later solo career. Scott would not release another album until 1984's Climate of Hunter.

Bowie listened to Nite Flights when making his 1979 album Lodger. Bowie biographer Nicholas Pegg attributed "Nite Flights" as an influence on the title of Lodgers "African Night Flight". He later covered "Nite Flights" in 1993 for his album Black Tie White Noise. Bowie recalled, "Scott sent me Nite Flights. I think he'd been very influenced by Low and 'Heroes', which [Eno and I] just finished. I have deep admiration for him, it was as a tribute that I did a version of 'Nite Flights' on Black Tie White Noise." Bowie later used "The Electrician" as a basis for "The Motel" from his 1995 album Outside.

Midge Ure claimed that "The Electrician" inspired him to write Ultravox's "Vienna".

Track listing

Personnel
According to the album's liner notes.

The Walker Brothers
 Scott Walker – vocals, bass, keyboards, production, mixing, sleeve design, photography
 Gary Leeds – vocals, percussion, sleeve design, photography
 John Walker – vocals, sleeve design, photography

Additional personnel
 Ronnie Ross – soprano saxophone
 Alan Skidmore – tenor saxophone
 Chris Mercer – saxophone
 Jim Sullivan – rhythm guitar
 Les Davidson – guitar
 Frank Gibson, Jr. – drums
 Peter Van Hooke – drums
 Mo Foster – bass
 Dill Katz – bass
 Dave MacRae – keyboards, orchestrations and conducting, production, mixing
 Morris Pert – percussion
 Joy Yates and Katie Kissoon – backing vocals
 Dennis Weinreich – backing vocals, mixing, recording
 Steve Parker – assistant engineering
 Hipgnosis – sleeve design, photography

Release details

References

Sources

External links
 

1978 albums
The Walker Brothers albums
Albums with cover art by Hipgnosis
GTO Records albums